The following highways are numbered 672:

Philippines
 N672 highway (Philippines)

United States

Canada